Michael A. Szonyi (born May 18, 1967) is Professor of Chinese History at Harvard University and the director of the Fairbank Center for Chinese Studies. His research focuses on the local history of southeast China, especially in the Ming dynasty, the history of Chinese popular religion, and Overseas Chinese history.

Biography
Szonyi received his BA from the University of Toronto and his D.Phil. from the University of Oxford, where he was a Rhodes Scholar. After completing his doctorate, he worked at McGill University, later moving to University of Toronto, where he received tenure in 2002. Szonyi came to Harvard in 2005, and was named John L. Loeb Associate Professor of the Humanities in 2007 and Professor of Chinese History in 2009. Today he splits his time between Cambridge and London, Ontario, where his wife, Francine McKenzie, is a professor of international relations at the University of Western Ontario. Professor Szonyi was appointed director of Harvard's Fairbank Center for Chinese Studies in 2015.

Publications
 The China Questions: Critical Insights into a Rising Power. Harvard 2018. (Co-edited with Jennifer Rudolph)
 The Art of Being Governed: Everyday Politics in Late Imperial China. Princeton 2017 
 A Companion to Chinese History. Wiley Blackwell 2017
 The Cold War in Asia: The Battle for Hearts and Minds. Brill, 2010. (Co-edited with Zheng Yangwen and Liu Hong)
 Cold War Island: Quemoy on the Front Line. Cambridge University Press, 2008. (Chinese Edition: NTU Press 2016)
 Ming-Qing Fujian Wudi xinyang ziliao huibian (Documents on the Cult of the Five Emperors in Fujian in Ming and Qing). Hong Kong University of Science and Technology South China Research Centre, 2006.
 Practicing Kinship: Lineage and Descent in Late Imperial China. Stanford University Press, 2002.
 Zheng Zhenman, Family and Lineage Organization and Social Change in Ming-Qing Fujian, translated and with an introduction by Michael Szonyi. University of Hawai'i Press, 2001.

References

External links
Homepage at Harvard

Canadian sinologists
Historians of China
Canadian Rhodes Scholars
Alumni of Merton College, Oxford
Harvard University faculty
Academic staff of the University of Toronto
20th-century Canadian historians
Canadian male non-fiction writers
Living people
Canadian people of Hungarian descent
1976 births
21st-century Canadian historians